Jonathan Fahn is an American voice actor, the brother of Melissa Fahn and Tom Fahn, the brother-in-law of Tom's wife, Dorothy Elias-Fahn, and the husband of Jennie Fahn.

Filmography

Anime dubbing
 Ambassador Magma as Mamoru Murakami
 Battle Athletes Victory as Kannoji, Operator
 Blue Dragon as Marumaro's Father
 Cowboy Bebop as Miles
 Digimon Adventure 02 as Poi Brother #2
 Digimon Data Squad as Connor Harris, Demi-Devimon
 Forest of Piano as Jean Jacques Serrault
 Hyper Doll as Akai
 JoJo's Bizarre Adventure: Stardust Crusaders as Wilson Philips
 Mansquito as Detective Charlie Morrison
 Mobile Suit Gundam 0083: Stardust Memory as Scott
 Naruto as Shikaku Nara
 Naruto Shippuden as Shikaku Nara 
 Phantom Quest Corp as Higashi Narita
 Rurouni Kenshin as Ryuji
 The Super Dimension Century Orguss as Hardy
 The Super Dimension Fortress Macross II: Lovers, Again as Hibiki Kanzaki
 Trigun as Hoppered the Gauntlet
 Yu Yu Hakusho: The Movie (Media Blasters dub) as Yusuke Urameshi
 Zatch Bell! as British Gentleman, additional voices

Video games
 Naruto Shippuden: Ultimate Ninja Storm 3 as Shikaku Nara
 Naruto Shippuden: Ultimate Ninja Storm 4 as Shikaku Nara
 Naruto Shippuden: Ultimate Ninja Storm Revolution as Shikaku Nara

References

External links

Year of birth missing (living people)
Living people
Place of birth missing (living people)
American male video game actors
American male voice actors
20th-century American male actors
21st-century American male actors